Synodus macrocephalus is a species of lizardfish that lives mainly in the Indo-West Pacific. A common English name largehead lizardfish.

Information
S. macrocephalus is known to be found in a marine environment within a demersal range. This species is native to a tropical climate. They commonly occupy Indonesia and the Chesterfield Islands. 

It is a marine species only recorded to live in salt water. S. macrocephalus is also known to be reef-associated when it comes to its living environment.

References

Notes
 

Synodontidae
Fish described in 1981